Höfner and Elser v Macrotron GmbH (1991) C-41/90 was a significant EU competition law case, concerning the definition of an "undertaking" and abuse of a dominant position.

Facts
The German Federal Office for Employment (Bundesanstalt) possessed a statutory monopoly on placing employees with employers. German law also allowed the Bundesanstalt after consulting with workers and employers associations to entrust other institutions or people with employment procurement services under its supervision. It had become the practice that a number of executive recruitment businesses developed, to which the Bundesanstalt turned a blind eye. However, without the explicit approval of the Bundesanstalt, acts, including contracts, which infringed the statutory provision were void under the German Civil Code.

Mr Höfner and Mr Elser were recruitment consultants who had placed a candidate as a sales director with a company called Macrotron GmbH. Macrotron GmbH had decided that they did not want the candidate. Mr Höfner and Mr Elser argued that the man was perfectly suitable, and sued for breach of contract. In its defence, Macrotron argued that any contract was void. Mr Höfner and Mr Elser therefore challenged the provision declaring the contract void under the EC competition law provision, Article 82.

Judgment
As a preliminary question, the European Court of Justice held that the Bundesanstalt, even though it was a public body, could be subject to competition laws. It was an "undertaking", and therefore fell within the scope of the Treaty. Furthermore, by failing to satisfy demand for a good or service, the exclusive right of the German government to regulate employment services could amount to the abuse of a dominant position.

See also
EC competition law

Notes

References
E McGaughey, A Casebook on Labour Law (Hart 2019) ch 16, 730

Court of Justice of the European Union case law
German case law
1991 in case law
1991 in Germany
European Union competition case law
European Union labour case law